Johi Tehsil is an administrative subdivision (Tehsil) of Dadu District in Sindh province of Pakistan. Johi Town is its capital. Its area is 3,616 km².  There are 14 union councils of Taluka including Tando Rahim Khan (TRK) and Sawaro.

History
In British period Johi was Taluka  of Karachi District until 1907. Later it was included in Larkana District. In 1931 Dadu had been given status of District and Johi was included in Dadu District as Taluka.

References 

Dadu District